Intradural pseudoaneurysm is a broad term to describe several subtypes of aneurysms that fundamentally are different from the more typical intracranial berry-type aneurysms.

References

Further reading

Vascular diseases